Johnny Hates Jazz are a British band, currently consisting of Clark Datchler (songwriter, vocalist, keyboards) and Mike Nocito (guitarist, bassist, producer, engineer). In April 1987, they achieved international success with their first hit single "Shattered Dreams."

Early career
Both Datchler and Nocito were born into musical families. Datchler's father, Fred, was a member of two chart-topping bands from the 1950s. The Stargazers had the distinction of being the first British band to reach No. 1 on the UK Singles Chart. As part of the Polkadots, Fred Datchler sang backing vocals for Frank Sinatra and Petula Clark. Nocito hails from an American family based in Europe with the U.S. armed forces. His mother was a singer in a close-harmony group called the Cactus Kids, which performed for troops throughout northern Europe.

Having been a singer, guitarist, and keyboard player in numerous bands as a teenager, Datchler at the age of 17 released his first single on the London independent record label Bluebird Records, backed by members of reggae band Aswad. He went on to work with Rusty Egan of Visage, fusing electronic music with soul, and performed often on the London club scene. He was subsequently signed to Warner Brothers Music as a songwriter, and moved to Los Angeles.

Nocito was a guitarist in school bands, having grown up alongside friend and fellow record producer Phil Thornalley, as well as members of Katrina and the Waves. He became a recording engineer and worked with Pink Floyd, the Police, the Cure, Duran Duran, and the Thompson Twins.

The two met in 1982 at RAK Studios in London. Datchler had just become lead singer in the band Hot Club, alongside the third and final original JHJ member Calvin Hayes. The line-up also included bass player Glen Matlock and guitarist James Stevenson. In 1983, Hot Club released a single on RAK Records and performed at London's Marquee Club, a performance that impressed RAK head (and Hayes' father), Mickie Most. He decided to sign Datchler to the label as a solo artist. It was Most who suggested that Datchler work with Nocito, who was an engineer at RAK Studios at the time. Over the next four years, the two worked together on Datchler's solo recordings. Most also guided Datchler, producing several of his recordings in the mid-1980s.

Original tenure
In April 1986, Datchler, Nocito and Hayes released the first Johnny Hates Jazz single, "Me and My Foolish Heart", on RAK Records. It was not a commercial success, but gained substantial airplay and was Sounds magazine's record of the week.

Datchler began writing new songs which included "Shattered Dreams". JHJ then performed a showcase at Ronnie Scott's Jazz Club, and were subsequently signed to Virgin Records. "Shattered Dreams" was released in March 1987 and became a top 5 hit in the UK, throughout mainland Europe and Asia, and reached No. 2 in Japan. It was followed by three other worldwide hits, "I Don't Want to Be a Hero", "Turn Back the Clock" (featuring Kim Wilde on backing vocals) and "Heart of Gold". In 1988, "Shattered Dreams" reached No. 2 on the US Billboard Hot 100, No. 1 on the US Adult Contemporary chart, and climbed to No. 4 in Canada. That same year, their album Turn Back the Clock entered the UK Albums Chart at No. 1, selling four million copies.

At the end of 1987, JHJ made two music videos with director David Fincher. The videos were for the US releases of "Shattered Dreams" and "Heart of Gold". Datchler left the band at the end of 1988.

Hayes and Nocito continued the band, and replaced Datchler with their friend Phil Thornalley, a Grammy Award-nominated engineer and record producer, and a former bass player for The Cure. The new line-up released a second album, Tall Stories, in 1991. However, the album was unsuccessful, and the band dissolved the following year due to a car accident in which Hayes was badly injured and in hospital for 2 years.

After the break-up
Datchler moved to Amsterdam at the end of the 1980s and focused on his solo work, recording the albums Raindance and Fishing for Souls. Returning to the UK, he based himself at Peter Gabriel's Real World Studios near Bath throughout the 1990s. In 2000, he moved to the US and created a solar-powered home and studio, where he recorded much of his most recent album, Tomorrow. Throughout this time, he studied the philosophy of indigenous people and became environmentally active. In 2008 he received a GreenTec Award (formerly the Clean Tech Media Awards) in Berlin.

Following the dissolution of Johnny Hates Jazz, Nocito based himself in Cambridge, England, and produced the Katrina and the Waves single "Love Shine a Light", a top 10 hit throughout Europe and winner of the 1997 Eurovision Song Contest. He also produced and wrote for Hepburn, Gina G, and Orson, and continued to work extensively with Katrina and the Waves.

New era
Datchler and Nocito met again in 2009 after Datchler wrote a song called "Magnetized", which he felt would be ideal for Johnny Hates Jazz. Soon after, they decided to record a new album. Datchler moved back to the UK and wrote the rest of the songs for the project. At the same time, the original line-up of Datchler, Nocito, and Hayes performed live at various international festivals. However, after several shows in 2010, Hayes left the band before recording of the new album commenced.

That same year, Datchler received a BMI award for "Shattered Dreams" in recognition of receiving over three million broadcast performances of the song in the US alone.

The subsequent album was titled Magnetized. Recording spanned much of 2011 and 2012, and took place at Real World Studios near Bath, Hamp Sound near Cambridge, and Angel Recording Studios in London. It featured Datchler as songwriter, vocalist, and keyboard player, and Nocito as producer and engineer. There were also string arrangements and additional keyboards from The Art of Noise's Anne Dudley, who had arranged the strings on "Turn Back The Clock". Other contributors included drummer Alex Reeves, guitarists David Rhodes and Marcus Bonfanti, synthesizer player Pete Watson, and mix engineer Stephen W. Tayler.

The first single, "Magnetized", was released in the UK on 28 April 2013, and received widespread airplay, being A-listed for several weeks on BBC Radio 2. It was also released in Germany and achieved similar success on radio there. The album was subsequently released on 5 May in the UK. However, Datchler collapsed in London shortly after this, and was diagnosed with a rare form of cancer. As a result, all promotion came to halt. It was not until the following year that he made a full recovery, but by that time the album had lost momentum, and the band decided to focus on live work instead.

After this, the band performed extensively in the UK at festivals, as well as in Germany and Asia. In 2017, they released a remixed version of "Magnetized" in China, as well as performing live. Subsequently, they began writing and recording material for a new album. In addition, Datchler co-wrote 11 songs with Mike Rutherford for the UK top 10 Mike + the Mechanics albums Let Me Fly and Out of the Blue.

The band released a new single, titled "Spirit Of Love", on 29 May 2020. It has a few inspirations and musical roots from the 1970s during which Datchler and Nocito grew up. Also on 29 May, it was announced in a trailer that a new album, Wide Awake, would be released on 14 August 2020. This was said to have been "two years in the making", and to contain "... a mixture of soulful melodies, uplifting lyrics, and a positive energy that is present from start to finish." On 4 June 2020, a music video was released that featured fan pictures and videos of what they loved most and the band members walking around and visiting different spots in Japan.

In October 2021, the band toured the UK supporting Level 42.

Band personnel
Current members
Clark Datchler (born 27 March 1964, Surrey, England) – vocals, keyboards, guitar (1986–1988; 2009–present)
Mike Nocito (born 5 August 1963, Wiesbaden, West Germany) – bass (1986–1992, 2009–present)

Former members
Calvin Hayes (born 23 November 1962, London) – keyboards, drums (1986–1992, 2009–2010)
Phil Thornalley (born 5 January 1960, Suffolk, England) – vocals (1988–1992)

Discography

Studio albums

Compilation albums
 The Very Best of Johnny Hates Jazz (Disky Records, 1993)
 Best of the '80s (Disky Records, 2000)

Singles

References

External links
Official Johnny Hates Jazz website
Superdeluxeedition

1986 establishments in the United Kingdom
Musical groups established in 1986
Musical groups disestablished in 1992
Musical groups reestablished in 2009
Musical groups from London
English pop music duos
English new wave musical groups
Sophisti-pop musical groups
Rak Records artists
Virgin Records artists